The Imperial German Navy  Zeppelin LZ 48 (L 15) was a P-class World War I zeppelin.

Operational history

The Airship took part in eight reconnaissance missions with three attacks on England dropping  of bombs.

Destruction

The Zeppelin was damaged by ground fire from Dartford AA battery during a raid on London on 1 April 1916. The airship came down at Kentish Knock Deep in the Thames estuary. One crew member was killed; the other 17 were taken prisoner of war after being picked up by ships.

Specifications

See also
List of Zeppelins

References

 

Airships of Germany
Hydrogen airships
Zeppelins
Aviation accidents and incidents in 1916
Accidents and incidents involving balloons and airships